An eco-city or ecocity is "a human settlement modeled on the self-sustaining resilient structure and function of natural ecosystems", as defined by Ecocity Builders (a non-profit organization started by Richard Register who first coined the term). Simply put, an eco-city is an ecologically healthy city. The World Bank defines eco-cities as "cities that enhance the well-being of citizens and society through integrated urban planning and management that harness the benefits of ecological systems and protect and nurture these assets for future generations". Although there is no universally accepted definition of an 'eco-city', among available definitions, there is some consensus on the basic features of an eco-city.

The world's population is continuously increasing, which puts a tremendous amount of pressure on cities due to the need for new urban development. There is an urgent need for cities around the world to adapt ecologically based urban development to work towards sustainability. The dimensions of an ecocity provide solutions to improve the living conditions in cities by solving our current unsustainable practices.

The cities around the world that face the most severe challenges associated with the world's urban population are those in developing countries. Eco-cities are commonly found to focus on new-build developments, especially in developing nations such as China, wherein foundations are being laid for new eco-cities catering to 500,000 or more inhabitants.

History

Origins
In the first half of the 19th century, the Garden City of Ebenezer Howard, the urbanistic thought of Frank Lloyd Wright and Le Corbusier laid the foundations for a radical change of paradigm and a comprehensive transformation in the urban planning canon.
During the post-war era, there was the spread of modernist tower blocks to satisfy the needs of urban slums.

Initial ideas behind the eco-cities can be traced back to 1975 with the formation of a non-profit organization called Urban Ecology. Founded by a group of visionary architects and activists including Richard Register in Berkeley, California, the organization worked at the intersection of urban planning, ecology, and public participation to help formulate design concepts centered around building environmentally healthier cities. Some of their efforts included initiating movements to plant trees along the main streets, promoting the construction of solar greenhouses, developing environment-friendly policies by working with the Berkeley city planning division and encouraging public transportation. Building on these strategies, Richard Register later coined the term 'ecocity' in his 1987 book titled "Ecocity Berkeley: Building Cities for a Healthy Future" describing it as a city where human beings live in harmony with nature and therefore greatly reducing their ecological footprint.  Urban Ecology began publishing articles focused on similar complex urban issues that elevated the movement further with the creation of their magazine, 'Urban Ecology' in 1987. For two decades, they also publish two newsletters, 'The Sustainable Activist' and 'The Urban Ecologist' to pursue their vision.

In the 1990s, there we two important events that began the initiative for eco-city developments. The first event involved the publication of the Brundtland Report. The Brundtland Report presented the idea of sustainable development. The second event occurred in 1992 at the United Nations Earth Summit. The members at the summit created a plan to apply sustainable development to our cities. The Eco-city's that were developed during this time period incorporated the concept of sustainable development. However, a majority of the developments were created to provide a vision of an eco-city. Eco-cities have now become a popular way to create sustainable new urban development.

International Ecocity Conference Series aka Ecocity World Summit

Urban Ecology further advanced the movement when they hosted the first International Ecocity Conference in Berkeley, California in 1990. The conference focused on urban sustainability problems and encouraged over 800 participants from 13 countries to submit proposals on best practices to reform cities for a better urban ecological balance.

Following this, in 1992, Richard Register founded the non-profit organization Ecocity Builders, to advance a set of goals outlined in the conference. Since its conception, the organization has been the convener of the International Ecocity Conference Series, now knowns as Ecocity World . The IECS has been the longest standing international conference series consisting of biennial Ecocity World Summits (EWS) and has been held in Adelaide, Australia (1992); Yoff, Senegal (1996); Curitiba, Brazil (2000); Shenzhen, China (2002); Bangalore, India (2006); San Francisco, United States (2008); Istanbul, Turkey (2009); Montreal, Canada (2011); Nantes, France (2013); Abu Dhabi, UAE (2015), Melbourne, Australia (2017); Vancouver, Canada (2019); and Rotterdam, the Netherlands (2022).

Other leading figures include architect Paul F Downton and authors Timothy Beatley and Steffen Lehmann, who have written extensively on the subject.

Current trends

Criteria 
An ideal eco-city has frequently been described as one that fulfills the following requirements:

 Operates on a self-contained economy that obtains resources locally
 Is entirely carbon-neutral by promoting techniques like the use and production of renewable energy 
 Is established over a well-planned city layout that promotes walkability, biking and the use of public transportation systems
 Promotes conservation of resource by maximizing water efficiency and energy efficiency, while managing an ecologically beneficial waste management system that promotes recycling and reuse to create a zero-waste system
 Restores environmentally damaged urban areas
 Ensures decent and affordable housing for all socio-economic and ethnic groups and improves jobs opportunities for disadvantaged groups, such as women, minorities, and the disabled
 Supports local agriculture and produce
Supports future progress and expansion over time.

Besides these, each individual eco-city has an additional set of requirements to ensure ecological and economic benefits that may range from large-scale targets like zero-waste and zero-carbon emissions, as seen in the Sino-Singapore Tianjin Eco-city project and the Abu Dhabi Masdar City project, to smaller-scale interventions like urban revitalization and establishment of green roofs as seen in the case of Augustenborg, Malmö, Sweden. Cities that focus on the use of carbon-free sustainable energy and on managing greenhouse gas emissions can be referred to as zero-carbon cities.

Ecocity Framework and Standards 
With a growing popularity of the concept, in the last few decades, there has been an exponential growth in the number of eco-cities established around the globe. To assess the performance of these eco-cities and provide future guidance, the Ecocity Framework and Standards, established by Ecocity Builders with technical support from the British Columbia Institute of Technology (BCIT) School of Construction and the Environment, provides a practical methodology for this to ensure progress towards the intended goals of eco-cities. The four pillars in this framework include:

 Urban Design (containing 4 criteria for access by proximity)
 Bio-geo Physical Features (containing 6 criteria for the responsible management of resources and materials as well as the generation and use of clean, renewable energy)
 Socio-cultural Features (containing 5 criteria for promoting cultural activities and community participation)
 Ecological Imperatives (containing 3 criteria to sustaining and restoring biodiversity)

Using these, the International Eco-Cities Initiative recently identified and rated as many as 178 significant eco-city initiatives at different stages of planning and implementation around the world. To be included in this census, initiatives needed to be at least district-wide in their scale, covering a variety of sectors, and have official policy status. Although such schemes display great variety in their ambitions, scale, and conceptual underpinnings, since the late 2000s there has been an international proliferation of frameworks of urban sustainability indicators and processes designed to be implemented across different contexts. This may suggest that a process of eco-city 'standardization' is underway.

Practical limits 
Richard Register once stated that "An ecocity is an ecologically healthy city. No such city exists". Despite the conceptual ecological benefits of eco-cities, actual implementation can be difficult to attain. The conversion of existing cities to eco-cities is uncommon because the infrastructure, both in terms of the physical city layout and local bureaucracy, are often major insurmountable obstacles to large-scale sustainable development. The high cost of the technological integration necessary for eco-city development is a major challenge, as many cities either can't afford, or are not willing to take on, the extra costs. Such issues, along with the added challenges and limits to retrofitting existing cities contribute to the establishment of newly constructed eco-cities. Along with this, the costs and infrastructure development needed to manage these large scale, two-pronged projects extend beyond the capabilities of most cities. In addition, many cities around the world are currently struggling to maintain the status quo, with budgetary issues, low growth rates, and transportation inefficiencies, that encourage reactive, coping policies. While there are many examples worldwide, the development of eco-cities is still limited due to the vast challenges and high costs associated with sustainability.

Related terminologies 
Eco-cities have been developed as a response to present-day unsustainable systems that exist in our cities. Simultaneously, there have been other concepts like smart cities, sustainable cities, and biophilic cities that also strive towards achieving sustainability in cities through different approaches. Owing to ambiguity in their definitions and closely related criteria defined to achieve their goals, these concepts, despite their varying approaches, are often used interchangeably.

Criticism

Three pitfalls 
Looking at the patterns of progress in the last few decades of city construction towards sustainability, Valaria Saiu (University of Cagliari) poses one major criticism through the existence of a theory-practice gap caused by economic and ethical conflicts and risks that generate socio-spatial utopias. She identifies three pitfalls in the concept of sustainable cities (and therefore, eco-cities):

 The Idea of the City as a Business: "Most eco-city projects are dependent on technologies available on the global market and the city is considered as a big economic affair". Often developed as techno-centric concepts, these projects seek investment opportunities by public-private partnerships leading to a top-down approach. This structure lacks democratic approaches in the decision-making process which further contributes to running high risks of failure, especially in social terms.
 The Oversimplification of Urban Complexity: Due to the nature of current trends in measuring sustainability, there has been a strong focus in the quantifiable aspects of sustainability like energy-efficiency or waste-efficiency. This creates a tendency of oversimplification by neglecting the social and political aspects of the city that are unmeasurable qualitative aspects, yet significant to the fundamental concept of eco-cities.
 The Quest for the Ideal Community: This section of the criticism focuses on the practical limits to merging economic goals with social goals in the urban development process. "Under the banner of green technology, inhabitants are forced to pay higher costs for their use of facilities in eco-cities."

Eco-cities as isolated entities 
Another larger conceptual criticism faced by eco-cities stems from the ambiguity in the definition of sustainability as a term. This has been further elaborated by Mike Hodson and Simon Marvin in their article titled 'Urbanism in the Anthropocene: Ecological Urbanism or Premium Ecological Enclaves' where they noted "We have tended to refer to sustainability in a generic sense, and our discussions of sustainability could be employed to anything that has sustainable as an adjective". As a result of this, a widespread trend has been observed in the growing number of eco-cities developed over the past two decades that claim to combat our current global climate-change challenges. Many of these cities are found to be established in isolation from other existing urban centers due to the nature of their ownership. Owing to this isolation, internalization of resource-flows contribute towards a shallow sense of ecological sustainability in such cities.

With regard to methods of emissions counting cities can be challenging as production of goods and services within their territory can be related either to domestic consumption or exports. Conversely the citizens also consume imported goods and services. To avoid double counting in any emissions calculation it should be made clear where the emissions are to be counted: at the site of production or consumption. This may be complicated given long production chains in a globalized economy. Moreover, the embodied energy and consequences of large-scale raw material extraction required for renewable energy systems and electric vehicle batteries is likely to represent its own complications – local emissions at the site of utilization are likely to be very small but life-cycle emissions can still be significant.

Urban ecological security (UES) and the social, economic and environmental impacts of eco-cities 
Eco-cities have also been criticized to have biases towards the economic and environmental pillars of sustainability while neglecting the social pillar. The practical translations of the concept have faced criticism as eco-cities have been driven by the demand for bounded ecological security. By offering "premium ecological enclaves" factoring ecological security as an outcome of private investments driving the construction of eco-cities, the existing examples of eco-cities are criticized for not being truly sustainable solutions. On the contrary, by placing this concept in the meta-narrative of sustainable cities, these have also been further criticized for celebrating this fragmentation of society through the development of gated communities and premium ecological enclaves isolated from the real global scale of issues in today's ecological crisis. For instance, the eco-cities of Masdar and Hong Kong pose homogeneous visions, but have been criticized to be the source of fragmentation of urban society.

The term "Frankenstein Urbanism" was used by Federico Cugurullo to metaphorically symbolize this criticism of the concept that increases social stratification in exchange for ecological security, creating isolated entities that could work perfectly within themselves, but fall apart when brought in a larger view.

See also 

Building insulation
Energy-plus building
Environmental planning
Green building
Green infrastructure
Green urbanism
Inclusive Development
List of low-energy building techniques
Low-energy house
Low impact developments (LIDs)
Passive solar building design
Quadruple glazing
Small wind turbine
Solar architecture
Sustainability measurement
Sustainable city
Urban farming
Urban vitality
Zero-carbon city
Zero-energy building
Zero heating building
Smart city

References 

Sustainable design
Sustainable urban planning
Cities by type